Dithiobiuret is an organosulfur compound with the formula HN(C(S)NH2)2.  It is a colourless solid that is soluble in warm water and polar organic solvents.  It is a planar molecule with short C-S and C-N distances (1.69, 1.38 Å, resp.) indicative of multiple C-S and C-N bonding.

The compound can be viewed as the product from the condensation of two molecules of thiourea, but it is prepared by treatment of 2-cyanoguanidine with hydrogen sulfide.  The conversion proceeds via guanylthiourea:
NCNC(NH2)  +  H2S   →   HN(C(S)NH2)(C(NH)NH2)
HN(C(S)NH2)(C(NH)NH2)  +  H2S   →   HN(C(S)NH2)2

It is used as a plasticizer, a rubber accelerator, and as an intermediate in pesticide manufacturing. It is extremely toxic; exposure can result in respiratory failure.

See also
 Biuret

References

External links
 
 Dithiobiuret at www.chemicalbook.com.

Thioureas